Phymateus karschi is a locust in the family Pyrgomorphidae.

Distribution
This species is present in Tropical Africa (mainly in Cameroon, Nigeria, Mozambique, Tanzania, Kenya, Malawi, Zaire and Eritrea). These locusts inhabit bushes and trees within Hyparrhenia grassland at submontane elevations between 900 and 1500 m on Mt Kilimanjaro.

Description
These locusts have a green yellowish  body. Pronotum shows red protuberances. Elytra are yellow with bluish and reddish areas. Femora are mainly yellowish, while tarsi are brown. The abdomen is dark brown and yellow.

Bibliography
 Bolívar, I. 1904. Bol. R. Soc. Esp. Hist. Nat. 4:406, 411
 Johnston, H.B. 1956. Annotated catalogue of African grasshoppers 150 
 Dirsh. 1964. Explor. Parc. natn. Garamba 44(3):49
 Dirsh. 1965. The African Genera of Acridoidea 117
 Johnston, H.B. 1968. Annotated catalogue of African grasshoppers Suppl:83
 Dirsh. 1970. Ann. Mus. Roy. Afr. Cent. 8(182):25 
 Kevan, D.K.M. [Ed.]. 1977. In Beier [Ed.]. Orthopterorum Catalogus 16:252 
 COPR (Centre for Overseas Pest Research). 1982. The Locust and Grasshopper Agricultural Manual 53
Hemp, C. 2009. Jour. Orth. Res. 18(2):194 
 Rowell, C. Hemp & Harvey. 2015. Jago's Grasshoppers of East and North East Africa, Vol. 1 113

References

External links

Pyrgomorphidae
Orthoptera of Africa
Insects described in 1904
Taxa named by Ignacio Bolívar